Arne Yven (18 July 1904 – 7 September 1970) was a Norwegian footballer. He played in one match for the Norway national football team in 1933.

References

External links
 

1904 births
1970 deaths
Norwegian footballers
Norway international footballers
Association footballers not categorized by position